Shades of black are colors that differ only slightly from pure black.

Shades of Black may also refer to:

 Shades of Black (organisation), a community organisation in the Handsworth area of Birmingham, England
 Shades of Black (EP), an EP by Solomon
 Shades of Black: The Conrad Black Story, a 2006 Canadian biographical film

See also
 Black (disambiguation)
 Shade (disambiguation)
 Off-white (disambiguation)